Brenandendron is a genus of plants in the family Asteraceae, native to tropical Africa. The genus is named for the British botanist John Patrick Micklethwait Brenan and its species were formerly placed in the genus Vernonia.

Species
, Plants of the World Online recognises the following species:
Brenandendron donianum 
Brenandendron frondosum 
Brenandendron titanophyllum

References

Vernonieae
Asteraceae genera